Bango Wind Farm is a wind farm under construction in the Australian state of New South Wales. It is being developed by CWP Renewables between the towns of Yass and Boorowa. Construction began in August 2019.22 of the turbines have been erected and 10 of those are fully operational.  It is expected to be completed late in 2021.

The wind farm consists of 46 wind turbines. They are GE turbines which generate up to 5.3 MW each, for a total rated capacity of 244 MW. The wind farm has an offtake agreement with Snowy Hydro for 100MW of its generation. It has another agreement to supply electricity to Woolworths to supply over 100 supermarkets.

It is delivered and constructed in five sections. Once constructed, it has both a ladder and a lift from the entrance door to the nacelle.

References

Wind farms in New South Wales